Leptocollonia thielei is a species of small sea snail with calcareous opercula, a marine gastropod mollusk in the family Colloniidae.

Description

The colorless shell grows to a height of 7 mm. It has a thin shell. It has a depressed-turbinate shape.

Distribution
This marine species occurs off the South Georgia Islands and the Antarctic Peninsula.

References

 Discovery Reports Issued by the National Institute of Oceanography vol. 26, 1954

External links
 To Antarctic Invertebrates
 To Biodiversity Heritage Library (1 publication)
 To Encyclopedia of Life
 To USNM Invertebrate Zoology Mollusca Collection
 To World Register of Marine Species

Colloniidae
Gastropods described in 1951